Irina Negrea (born 19 October 1952) is a Romanian literary translator, journalist and editor.

Biography 
Irina Negrea holds a M.A. at the University of Bucharest, majored in English, French and Latin language and literature. She specializes in literary translations from French and English language works into Romanian. Her other specialities include translation of non-fiction books (media, information and communication, reference/dictionaries, memoirs, history etc.).

She has translated more than sixty books which were published by Romanian publishing houses such as Humanitas publishing house, Rao, Editura Univers, Nemira, Art, Editura Paralela 45, Leda, Corint Junior, Vivaldi, Editura Curtea Veche, Litera, Lider, Editura Trei etc.

A freelance journalist and an editorial advisor for publishers, she was formerly a deputy chief editor of Cotidianul and a TV media advisor for the Romanian Television Corporation (Televiziunea Română).

She received the "Lucian Blaga" Literary Award for the translation in Romanian of the novel D'un château l'autre (Castle to Castle) by Louis-Ferdinand Céline.

She is a member of the Writers' Union of Romania.

Works

Translations of Louis-Ferdinand Céline's novels 
 Louis-Ferdinand Céline, Feerie pentru altă dată I; Feerie pentru alta dată II (Normance) (Féerie pour une autre fois I; Féerie pour une autre fois II – Normance), Editura Paralela 45, 2012
 Louis-Ferdinand Céline, Guignol's Band I și II (London's Bridge), Editura Paralela 45, 2009
 Louis-Ferdinand Céline, De la un castel la altul (D'un château l'autre), Nemira, 1996 and 2006 (reprint)
 Louis-Ferdinand Céline, Nord, Nemira, 2002 and 2010 (reprint)
 Louis-Ferdinand Céline, Rigodon, Nemira, 2002 and 2010 (reprint)

Other Published Translations (a selection) 
 Tibor Fischer, Banda mintoșilor (The Thought Gang), Humanitas, 2006
 Nick Hornby, Turnul sinucigașilor (A Long Way Down), Humanitas, 2006 and 2014 (republished with the title Adio, dar mai stau puţin)
 Peter Mayle, Accept orice (Anything Considered), Humanitas, 2005
 Tim Lott, Învățăturile lui Don Juan (The Love Secrets of Don Juan), Humanitas, 2007
 Sarah Dunant, Nașterea lui Venus (The Birth of Venus), Humanitas, 2007
 Nigel Williams, Crimele din Wimbledon (The Wimbledon Trilogy), Humanitas, 2005
 Tibor Fischer, La genunchiul broaștei (Under the Frog), Humanitas, 2008
 Richard Ford, Cronicarul sportiv (The Sportswriter), Humanitas, 2006
 Marchizul de Custine, Scrisori din Rusia. Rusia în 1839 ( La Russie en 1839), Humanitas, 1991 and 2007 (reprint)
 Michael Sadler, Un englez amorezat. Dragostea în Franța profundă (An Englishman Amoureux: Love in Deepest France), Humanitas, 2012
 Granta 97:  Best of Young American Novelists 2 (Antologia Granta: Kevin Brockmeier; Jonathan Safran Foer; Nicole Krauss; Karen Russell), Leda, 2009
 Tim Parks, Europa, Leda, 2010
 Jonathan Lethem, Orfani în Brooklyn (Motherless Brooklyn), Leda, 2011
 Kate Atkinson, Viața ca un joc de crochet (Human Croquet), Leda, 2013
 C. S. Lewis, Călătorie pe mare cu "Zori de Zi" (The Voyage of the Dawn Treader), RAO, 2000
 C. S. Lewis, Ultima bătălie (The Last Battle), RAO, 1999
 C. S. Lewis, Jilțul de argint (The Silver Chair), RAO, 1999
 Pat Alexander, Biblia pentru cei mici (The Lion First Bible), RAO, 1999
 Michel Faber, Petale de roșu și alb (The Crimson Petal and the White), Kobalt, 2007
 Stuart Kelly,  Cartea cărților pierdute  (The Book of Lost Books), Nemira, 2007
 Kimberley Cornish, Evreul din Linz (The Jew of Linz), Nemira, 2007
 John Banville, Atena (Athena), Nemira, 2008
  A. S. Byatt, Natură moartă (Still Life), Nemira, 2008
 Frédéric Rouvillois, Istoria snobismului (Histoire du snobisme), Nemira, 2010
 Francois Gresle, Michel Panoff, Michel Perrin, Pierre Tripier, "Dicționar de științe umane" ("Dictionnaire des sciences humaines"), Nemira, 2000
 Jean Cantos, Manuscrisul jupînului Godemer (Le manuscrit de maître Godemer), Nemira, 1997
 Wilkie Collins, Femeia în alb (The Woman in White), Lider, 2000
 Robert Ludlum, Compromisul (Trevayne), Lider
 Pierre Lorrain, Incredibila alianţă Rusia-Statele Unite (L'Incroyable alliance Russie – États-Unis),Editura Ştiinţelor Sociale şi Politice, 2003
 George R. R. Martin, Gardner Dozois, Daniel Abraham: Fuga vînătorului (Hunter's Run), Nemira, 2012
 Adele Faber, Elaine Mazlish, Comunicarea eficientă cu copiii (How to Talk so Kids Can Learn), Curtea Veche, 2002
 Joseph O'Connor, Steaua mărilor (Star of the Sea), Curtea Veche, 2005
 Iain Pears, Mîna lui Giotto (Giotto's Hand), Nemira, 2011
 Sophie Hannah, O păpușă sau alta (Little Face), Nemira, 2011
 Dorothy L. Sayers, Reclama ucigașă (Murder Must Advertise), Nemira, 2009
 Peter Carey, Parrot şi Olivier în America (Parrot and Olivier in America), Art, 2015
 Jean des Cars, Saga dinastiei de Habsburg: de la Sfântul Imperiu la Uniunea Europeană (La saga des Habsbourg. Du Saint Empire à l'Union européenne), Editura Trei, 2005
 Simon Sebag Montefiore, Discursuri care au schimbat lumea (Speeches That Changed the World), Editura Trei, 2015
 Jean des Cars, Sceptrul şi sângele: Regi şi regine în tumultul celor două Războaie mondiale (Le Sceptre et le sang. Rois et reines dans la tourmente des deux guerres mondiales), Editura Trei, 2016
 Scott Anderson, Lawrence în Arabia: război, mistificare, nesăbuinţă imperială şi crearea Orientului Mijlociu modern (Lawrence in Arabia. War, Deceit, Imperial Folly and the Making of the Modern Middle East), Editura Trei, 2016
 Dave Eggers, O hologramă pentru rege (A Hologram for the King), Humanitas Fiction, 2016
 Eleanor Catton, Luminătorii (The Luminaries), Art, 2016
 Richard Yates, Parada de Paşte (The Easter Parade), Litera, 2016

Notes

References 
 Translator Irina Negrea
 Translator Irina Negrea
 Author Irina Negrea
 Irina Negrea author, IF VERSO – Database and social network for books in translation (site international)

 Gabi Zamora, „Nemira publică trilogia lui Céline”, Cotidianul, annul IV, nr. 58(1406), luni 11 martie 1996

 Tereza Petrescu, „Doctorul Destouches, célinianul” (Dosar Louis-Ferdinand Céline: „Dumnezeule, ce greoi erau !”), în Cartea, annul II, nr. 2(7), februarie 1996

 Dan Stanca, „Neantul prin Céline”, Litere, Arte, Idei (Supplement cultural Cotidianul), nr. 13 (242), annul VI, 1 aprilie 1996

 Florian Băiculescu, „Răzvrătirea lui Céline”, Libertatea, nr. 1823, luni, 1 aprilie 1996

 Dan Stanca, „La Nemira/Un nou roman de Céline”, România liberă, 18 martie 1996

 Alexandru Spânu, „Louis-Ferdinand Céline, De la un castel la altul”, Luceafărul, nr.12 (265), miercuri 27 martie 1996

 Alexandru Spânu, Marchizul de Custine: Scrisori din Rusia (Rusia în 1939), Luceafărul, nr. 14 (223), miercuri 12 aprilie 1995

 Octavian Soviany, "Satanismul modern. Castelul mizantropiei și al romanului", Cuvîntul, annul II (VII), nr. 5 (229), mai 1996

 Dan C. Mihăilescu, Omul care aduce cartea – PRO TV

 Avanpremieră editorială: Louis-Ferdinand Céline de Irina Negrea , România literară, nr. 5, 2012

 Andreea Răsuceanu, Fragmente și cronici ale cărților pe hîrtie. Sarah Dunant, Nașterea lui Venus, traducere de Irina Negrea, Atelier LiterNet, 12.03.2008, cronică preluată din Idei în dialog, noiembrie 2007

 Fragmente și cronici ale cărților pe hîrtie, Richard Ford, Cronicarul sportiv, traducere de Irina Negrea, avanpremieră editorială, Atelier LiterNet, 1.10.2008

 Lettre Internationale – Ediția română, nr. 63/2007: Fragment din romanul Cronicarul sportiv de Richard Ford, în curs de apariție la Editura Humanitas, în traducerea semnată de Irina Negrea

 Europa de Tim Parks, traducere de Irina Negrea, avanpremieră editorială, Ziarul de duminica, 16 iunie 2010

 Fragmente și cronici ale cărților pe hîrtie. Orfani în Brooklyn de Jonathan Lethem, traducere de Irina Negrea, avanpremieră editorială, Atelier LitNet, 28 noiembrie 2011

  Fragment din romanul Viața ca un joc de crochet de Kate Atkinson, în pregătire la Editura Leda. Traducere din limba engleză de Irina Negrea, Ziarul de Duminică, 14 februarie 2013

Romanian translators
Romanian journalists
Writers from Bucharest
1952 births
Living people